Lorenzo "Renzo" Akrosie (born 12 September 1996) is a Surinamese professional footballer who plays as a midfielder for SVB Eerste Divisie club PVV and the Suriname national team.

Club career 
During the 2018–19 season with Sportvereniging Nationaal Leger (known as SNL), Akrosie scored a total of 33 goals.

In 2019, after leaving SNL, Akrosie joined PVV.

International career 
Akrosie's debut for Suriname came in a 4–0 friendly win against French Guiana on 18 August 2018.

References

External links 
 
 

1996 births
Living people
Surinamese footballers
Sportspeople from Paramaribo
Association football midfielders
Sportvereniging Nationaal Leger players
Politie Voetbal Vereniging players
SVB Eerste Divisie players
Suriname international footballers